Eskimo Artist: Kenojuak is a 1964 Canadian short film about Inuk artist Kenojuak Ashevak, directed by John Feeney and produced by the National Film Board of Canada (NFB).
It won the BAFTA Award for Best Short Film in 1964 and, in 1965, was nominated for the Academy Award for Best Documentary Short Film.

The 19-minute documentary shows how the drawings of Inuit artist Kenojuak Ashevak are transferred to stone and printed before being sold to museums and collectors. Ashevak was the first woman involved with the printmaking cooperative in Cape Dorset.

The NFB notes: ..."this is an archival film that makes use of the word “Eskimo,” an outdated and offensive term. While the origin of the word is a matter of some contention, it is no longer used in Canada. The term was formally rejected by the Inuit Circumpolar Council in 1980 and has subsequently not been in use at the NFB."

Eskimo Artist: Kenojuak found new life again in 1992, when filmmakers Colin Low and Tony Ianzelo combined archival and contemporary footage of Kenojuak in Momentum, Canada's IMAX HD film for Expo '92.

Awards
18th British Academy Film Awards, London: BAFTA Award for Best Short Film, 1964
 Cork International Film Festival, Cork, Ireland: Statuette of St. Finbarr - First Prize,  Art Films, 1964
 Festival of Tourist and Folklore Films, Brussels: Gold Medal - First Prize, 1965
 Melbourne International Film Festival, Melbourne: Silver Boomerang - Second Prize, 1965
 International Exhibition of Scientific Film, Buenos Aires: Second Prize, Category C, 1965
 Columbus International Film & Animation Festival, Columbus, Ohio: Chris Award, Education & Information, 1966
 American Film and Video Festival, New York: First Prize, Graphic Arts, Sculpture and Architecture, 1967
Panama International Film Festival, Panama City, Panama: Grand Prize for Best Documentary, 1966
Thessaloniki International Film Festival, Thessaloniki, Greece: First Prize, Foreign Film, 1967
Festival of Cultural Films, La Felguera, Spain: Silver Plaque, 1967
 Philadelphia International Festival of Short Films, Philadelphia: Award of Exceptional Merit, 1971
FIBA International Festival of Buenos Aires, Buenos Aires: Diploma of Honor, 1968
Tokyo International Film Festival, Tokyo, Japan: Certificate of Merit, 1966
 Vancouver International Film Festival, Vancouver: Certificate of Merit, 1964
 Venice Film Festival, Venice, Italy: Special Mention, 1964
37th Academy Awards, Los Angeles: Nominee: Best Documentary Short Subject, 1965

References

External links

Watch the film at NFB.ca

1960s English-language films
1964 documentary films
1964 short films
Canadian short documentary films
Inuktitut-language films
National Film Board of Canada documentaries
Films directed by John Feeney
Documentary films about visual artists
Documentary films about women
Inuit art
Films produced by Tom Daly
National Film Board of Canada short films
Documentary films about Inuit in Canada
Quebec films
1960s short documentary films
Inuit films
Films about Inuit in Canada
1960s Canadian films